Vijapur railway station is a railway station in Mahesana district, Gujarat, India on the Western line of the Western Railway zone. MG Rail bus trains start from here for Ambliyasan.

References 

Railway stations in Mahesana district
Ahmedabad railway division